Koibal may refer to:
Koibal people
Koibal language:
The Koybal dialect of the Khakas language, a modern Turkic language.
The Koibal dialect of the Kamassian language, an extinct Samoyedic language.